The Measuring, Selection and Placement Center (ÖSYM) is the body responsible for organizing the national level university entrance examination Student Selection and Placement System, and several other large scale examinations in Turkey. ÖSYM also operates the world's one and only government-operated dedicated large scale (5600 people at a time) computer-based test center.

Foreign language exams

 Foreign Language Exam (YDS), there are also:
 YÖKDİL, a test in a similar format to YDS, but limited to Turkish universities in validity
 YKS-YDT, the foreign language part of the Student Selection and Placement System
 a section of the teacher's exam (ÖABT) for foreign language teachers.

See also
Education in Turkey

References

External links
 Official site 
 ÖSYM Sınav Takvimi 2015 

Education in Turkey
Standardized tests in Turkey